Chung Yan Road, is a road in Tung Chung, near Yat Tung Estate.

See also
 North Lantau Hospital
 Yat Tung Estate
 Tung Chung Road
 Tung Chung

References

Tung Chung
Roads in the New Territories